William F. Ryan (1907–1954), nicknamed The Bronx Comet, was an American checkers player who won national titles in both 1939 and 1946. He counted Sam Gonotsky as a mentor and friend. He was known as the champion of "blindfold checkers" and wrote several books on the game. He also worked on a draughts magazine and once played against musician Benny Goodman. He died of a cerebral hemorrhage in 1954.

References 

American checkers players
People from the Bronx
1907 births
1954 deaths